Wädenswil–Vorder Au is one of the 111 serial sites of the UNESCO World Heritage Site Prehistoric pile dwellings around the Alps, of which 56 are located in Switzerland.

Geography 
The site is located at the Au peninsula respectively partially on the area of Schloss Au on Zürichsee lakeshore in Au, a locality of the municipality of Wädenswil in the Canton of Zürich in Switzerland. The settlement comprises , and the buffer zone including the lake area comprises  in all.

Description 
Located on the Au peninsula, the site has yielded special pottery from the transitional period between the Pfyn and Horgen cultures. The Corded Ware settlement phase contained a bell beaker, which allowed to draw conclusions on the links between the Corded Ware and Bell Beaker cultures. Since it has yielded a special type of pottery, the Early Bronze Age settlement phase is also important, and helps trace the distribution of Arbon style pottery in the region during the 17th century BC.

Protection 
As well as being part of the 56 Swiss sites of the UNESCO World Heritage Site Prehistoric pile dwellings around the Alps, the settlement is also listed in the Swiss inventory of cultural property of national and regional significance as a Class A object of national importance. Hence, the area is provided as a historical site under federal protection, within the meaning of the Swiss Federal Act on the nature and cultural heritage (German: Bundesgesetz über den Natur- und Heimatschutz NHG) of 1 July 1966. Unauthorised researching and purposeful gathering of findings represent a criminal offense according to Art. 24.

See also 
 Prehistoric pile dwellings around Zürichsee

Literature 
 Peter J. Suter, Helmut Schlichtherle et al.: Pfahlbauten – Palafittes – Palafitte. Palafittes, Biel 2009. .
 Beat Eberschweiler: Ur- und frühgeschichtliche Verkehrswege über den Zürichsee: Erste Ergebnisse aus den Taucharchäologischen Untersuchungen beim Seedamm. In: Mitteilungen des Historischen Vereins des Kantons Schwyz, Volume 96, Schwyz 2004.

References

External links 

 

Prehistoric pile dwellings in Switzerland
Wädenswil
Lake Zurich
Cultural property of national significance in the canton of Zürich
Archaeological sites in Switzerland
Corded Ware culture
Beaker culture